Quorey Payne (born October 12, 1982) is a former American football wide receiver. He played college football at Southern Illinois University Carbondale and attended Clewiston High School in Clewiston, Florida. Payne has been a member of the Green Bay Blizzard, Spokane Shock, Cleveland Gladiators and New Orleans VooDoo. He was a member of the Spokane Shock Team that won ArenaBowl XXIII.

References

External links
Just Sports Stats
AFL profile
Southern Illinois Salukis profile

Living people
1982 births
Players of American football from Florida
American football wide receivers
American football defensive backs
African-American players of American football
Southern Illinois Salukis football players
Green Bay Blizzard players
Mahoning Valley Thunder players
Spokane Shock players
Cleveland Gladiators players
New Orleans VooDoo players
People from Clewiston, Florida
21st-century African-American sportspeople
20th-century African-American people